The 2010–11 Hellenic Football League season was the 58th in the history of the Hellenic Football League, a football competition in England.

Premier Division

Premier Division featured 17 clubs which competed in the division last season, along with five new clubs:
Bracknell Town, relegated from the Southern Football League
Slimbridge, promoted from Division One West
Thame United, promoted from Division One East
Wokingham & Emmbrook, promoted from Division One East
Wootton Bassett Town, promoted from Division One West

League table

Division One East

Division One East featured 13 clubs which competed in the division last season, along with one new club:
Hungerford Town reserves, promoted from Reserve Division One

League table

Division One West

Division One West featured twelve clubs which competed in the division last season, along with three new clubs, relegated from the Premier Division:
Bicester Town
Hook Norton
Malmesbury Victoria

League table

References

External links
 Hellenic Football League

2010-11
9